Lesmone is a genus of moths in the family Erebidae. The genus was erected by Jacob Hübner in 1818.

Species
Lesmone aemylis (Druce, 1890) Panama, Costa Rica
Lesmone aenaria (Druce, 1890) Costa Rica, Guatemala, Mexico, Texas
Lesmone bayamona (Schaus, 1940) Puerto Rico
Lesmone brevimarginata (Schaus, 1912) Guyana
Lesmone camptogramma (Hampson, 1926) Gyuana
Lesmone cinerea (Butler, 1878) Jamaica
Lesmone detrahens (Walker, 1858) Florida, Texas – detracted owlet moth
Lesmone duplicans (Möschler, 1880) Suriname
Lesmone ellops (Guenée, 1852) French Guiana
Lesmone formularis (Geyer, 1837) southern US, Neotropical
Lesmone fufius (Schaus, 1894) Mexico
Lesmone gentilis (Schaus, 1894) Mexico
Lesmone griseipennis (Grote, 1882) Arizona – gray-winged owlet moth
Lesmone gurda (Guenée, 1852) Saint Thomas
Lesmone hinna (Geyer, 1837) southern US - Brazil, Antilles
Lesmone inopia (Felder & Rogenhofer, 1874) French Guiana
Lesmone iolas (Dognin, 1912) French Guiana
Lesmone irregularis (Hübner, [1808])
Lesmone limonia (Guenée, 1852) French Guiana
Lesmone magdalia (Guenée, 1852) French Guiana
Lesmone nigrilunata (Schaus, 1914) French Guiana
Lesmone pannisca (Schaus, 1901) Parana in Brazil
Lesmone pestilens (Dognin, 1914) Paraguay
Lesmone planitis (Dyar, 1922) Mexico
Lesmone porcia (Stoll, 1790) Pernambuco in Brazil
Lesmone pulchra (Schaus, 1914) Suriname
Lesmone retardens (Walker, 1858) Honduras
Lesmone umbrifera (Hampson, 1926) Guyana

References

Omopterini
Moth genera